Prado Verde is a census-designated place (CDP) in El Paso County, Texas, United States. The population is 246 according to the 2010 census. It is part of the El Paso Metropolitan Statistical Area. The ZIP Code encompassing the CDP area is 79932.

Geography
Prado Verde is located at  (31.890005, -106.613181).

Demographics
As of the census of 2000, there were 200 people, 60 households, and 55 families residing in the CDP. The population density was 1,557.7 people per square mile (594.0/km2). There were 62 housing units at an average density of 482.9/sq mi (184.1/km2). The racial makeup of the CDP was 98.00% White, 0.50% Native American, and 1.50% from two or more races. Hispanic or Latino of any race were 55.00% of the population.

There were 60 households, out of which 51.7% had children under the age of 18 living with them, 85.0% were married couples living together, 3.3% had a female householder with no husband present, and 8.3% were non-families. 8.3% of all households were made up of individuals, and 1.7% had someone living alone who was 65 years of age or older. The average household size was 3.33 and the average family size was 3.51.

In the CDP, the population was spread out, with 35.0% under the age of 18, 6.5% from 18 to 24, 26.5% from 25 to 44, 24.5% from 45 to 64, and 7.5% who were 65 years of age or older. The median age was 36 years. For every 100 females, there were 119.8 males. For every 100 females age 18 and over, there were 97.0 males.

The median income for a household in the CDP was $49,286, and the median income for a family was $68,056. Males had a median income of $38,409 versus $45,179 for females. The per capita income for the CDP was $14,186. None of the families and 3.9% of the population were living below the poverty line.

Education
It is in the Canutillo Independent School District. Residents are zoned to Gonzalo and Sofia Garcia Elementary School, and Canutillo Middle School. Canutillo High School is the zoned comprehensive high school for the entire school district.

References

Census-designated places in El Paso County, Texas
Census-designated places in Texas